Newport is a census-designated place (CDP) in Cynthian Township, Shelby County, Ohio, United States. The community is located along the Miami and Erie Canal and at the intersection of State Routes 47 and 66.

Newport was platted in 1839. 

Newport is primarily a Roman Catholic community, as evidenced by Saints Peter and Paul Church on Ohio Route 66 and a local chapter of the Knights of Columbus. Hickory Hill Lakes, located at the northern outskirts of this community, is the site of the yearly Country Concert, an outdoor country music festival originally billed as "Country Concert In The Hills", held since 1980. Newport once boasted a produce market at the highway intersection which now houses a tool and die business.

References

Census-designated places in Shelby County, Ohio